David Taro is a Solomon Islands soccer defender. He usually played as a right back. He was part of 2010 FIFA World Cup qualifiers.

He played for Honiara Rangers F.C. from 2007 to 2010; and for Hekari United F.C., based in Port Moresby, Papua New Guinea, from July 2010 to June 2011.

References

Living people
Solomon Islands footballers
Solomon Islands international footballers
1984 births
People from Honiara
Association football fullbacks